Augustus W. Holton (1850-1911) was an American architect from Westfield, Massachusetts.

Augustus Holton's father was a farmer and a carpenter, and thus Holton was apprenticed to carpenter Jonathan Turner of Keene at the age of 17. Circa 1870 he went south to Springfield, and west to Westfield in 1872. There, he worked for C. K. Lambson (carpentry), W. A. Johnson (organ manufacturing), and T. J. Green (masonry). He established himself as an architect in the early 1890s. He practiced alone for his entire career, until his death in 1911.

Holton was also heavily involved in town and commercial affairs.

At least two of Holton's works have been individually listed on the National Register of Historic Places, and several others contribute to listed historic districts.

Architectural works

 1892 - Southwick Public Library (Old), 475 College Hwy, Southwick, Massachusetts
 1896 - Gowdy Bros. Building, 16-20 Arnold St, Westfield, Massachusetts
 1897 - Robert B. Crane Estate (Sunnyside Ranch), 65 Sunnyside Rd, Southwick, Massachusetts
 Comprising a main house and several barns, now the Ranch Golf Club
 1897 - Prospect Hill School, 33 Montgomery St, Westfield, Massachusetts
 Expanded in 1919 by M. B. Harding
 1898 - Ashley Street School, Ashley & Cross Sts, Westfield, Massachusetts
 Demolished in 2012
 1898 - D. L. Gillett Block, 100 Elm St, Westfield, Massachusetts
 1898 - St. Mary's R. C. School, 35 Bartlett St, Westfield, Massachusetts
 1899 - Bismarck Hotel, 16 Union Ave, Westfield, Massachusetts
 1900 - Y. M. C. A. (Rinnova) Building, 105 Elm St, Westfield, Massachusetts
 1903 - Pine Street School, 13 Pine St, Northfield, Massachusetts
 1906 - Elwin C. Hills House, 26 College Hwy, Southwick, Massachusetts
 1909 - Northfield High School (Old), 104 Main St, Northfield, Massachusetts

References

1850 births
1911 deaths
19th-century American architects
Architects from Massachusetts
People from Northfield, Massachusetts
People from Westfield, Massachusetts